Ganapavaram is a village in Eluru district of the Indian state of Andhra Pradesh.

Geography

The village is located at 16° 42' 0" North, 81° 28' 0" East.
Ganapavaram is located at between the Tadepalligudem and Bhimavaram.

Demographics 

 Census of India, Ganapavaram had a population of 11749. The total population constitute, 5779 males and 5790 females with a sex ratio of 1033 females per 1000 males. 996 children are in the age group of 0–6 years, with sex ratio of 1000. The average literacy rate stands at 79.02%.

References

Villages in Eluru district